The 2017–18 Biathlon IBU Cup was a multi-race tournament over a season of biathlon, organised by the International Biathlon Union. IBU Cup is the second-rank competition in biathlon after the Biathlon World Cup. The season started on 22 November 2017 in Sjusjøen, Norway and ended on 17 March 2018 in Khanty-Mansiysk, Russia. The defending overall champions from the 2016–17 Biathlon IBU Cup were Alexey Volkov of Russia and Daria Virolaynen of Russia.

Calendar
Below is the IBU Cup calendar for the 2017–18 season.

Notes
 All European Championships races included in the IBU Cup total score.
 Super sprint races were included in the sprint total score.

IBU Cup podiums

Men

Women

Mixed

Standings (men)

Overall 

Final standings after 20 races.

Individual 

Final standings after 4 races.

Sprint 

Final standings after 12 races.

Pursuit 

Final standings after 4 races.

Mixed relay 

Final standings after 8 races.

Nation 

Final standings after 24 races.

Standings (women)

Overall 

 Final standings after 20 races.

Individual 

 Final standings after 4 races.

Sprint 

 Final standings after 12 races.

Pursuit 

 Final standings after 4 races.

Mixed relay 

Final standings after 8 races.

Nation 

Final standings after 24 races.

Medal table

References

External links
IBU official site

IBU Cup
2017 in biathlon
2018 in biathlon